Antaratma is an upcoming Bangladeshi romantic family drama film. The film directed by Wajed Ali Sumon and produced by Sohani Hossain under the banner of her own Taranga Entertainment. It feature Shakib Khan and Darshana Banik in the lead roles. The film marked as the second collaboration between Sohani Hossain and Shakib Khan after the huge success of Swatta (2017) and the second collaboration between Shahed Sharif Khan and Shakib Khan after the 2004 film Hridoy Shudhu Tomar Jonno.

Synopsis
A boy is very lonely. He has no one on earth. There are others, who do not want to understand him. His lover also does not understand his mind. The life of a boy named Prothom (Shakib Khan) is very difficult. There is no such thing as a lack of wealth, starting from the palace of Prothom, who lived a life of gloomy life, clinging to algae on the shelf of sorrow. There are only cries for love. Once upon a time, Prothom, who was poor in love, found another life. It can be called a dark world.

Cast
 Shakib Khan as Prothom
 Darshana Banik as Rupkotha
 Shahed Sharif Khan as Zaker
 Jhuna Chowdhury
Aruna Biswas
 SM Mohsin
 Maruf Khan

Production

Casting
On February 16, 2021, Indian actress Darshana Banik was contracted to play the lead role in the film. The next day, on February 18, Shakib Khan signed a contract with production company Tarang Entertainment for the lead role, later on the same day, the official announcement of the production of the film and the name of the lead actress Darshana Banik were revealed. Later, on February 28, 2021, actor Shahed Sharif Khan signed on for the role of Zaker in the film, where he will play antagonist.

Filming
The film was originally scheduled to be shot on March 1, 2021, but was postponed to March 6, 2021 due to some complications. Then on March 5, 2021, the crews of the film went to Pabna, Bangladesh for filming and the Muhurta of the film was held at Ratnadwip Resort in Pabna that night. The next day, on March 6, the film's principal photography officially began at the Ratnadwip Resort in Pabna, with the participation of lead actor Shakib Khan and Shahed Sharif Khan and other crews. Then on March 7, Shakib Khan posted a new look on his Facebook and Instagram accounts, which went viral on the internet and was appreciated by critics and audiences. Also on March 11, lead actress Darshana Banik participated in the filming. On April 4, 2021, Shakib Khan finished filming his own part, then he returned to Dhaka from Pabna on April 5. The shooting of the film was completed on April 7, 2021. The film's director Wajed Ali Sumon told The Daily Star that, "The post-production of the film is taking place in India. If the (COVID-19) pandemic is within control, the film will be released on the coming Eid-ul-Fitr."

On April 4, 2021, Shakib Khan was injured in the left eye by actress Darshana Banik's fingernail while filming a romantic song sequence. After treatment, he went to rest at Ratnadeep Resort. The filming of the film was suspended.

Music
In the mid-June 2021, Nazmun Munira Nancy recorded the first song of the film. She collaborated with Shakib Khan about 5 years after the 2016 film Bossgiri. Indian singer Samarjit Roy, who made his debut in Bangladesh, sang duet with her in the song titled "Rakhi Jotne Saradin". The song is written by Hritam Sen and composed and music arranged by Indradeep Dasgupta, winner of the National Film Award of India. On July 17, 2021, lyricist Robiul Islam Jibon informed with his a Facebook post that he had written two songs for the film, which will be composed by Indradeep Dasgupta also. He said that, the filming of these two songs with the demo version has already been done. In a few days, the artists will give voice to the songs.

Release
The film was initially scheduled to release on Eid al-Fitr in 2021. Subsequently, it was postponed due to the second wave of COVID-19 pandemic in Bangladesh. The film release date will be rescheduled, when the effects of the second wave of COVID-19 subside.

References

External links
 

Upcoming films
Bengali-language Bangladeshi films
Bangladeshi drama films
Upcoming Bengali-language films
Films directed by Wajed Ali Sumon
Films set in Pabna
Films shot in Pabna
Films set in the 1980s
Films scored by Indradeep Dasgupta
Films postponed due to the COVID-19 pandemic
Film productions suspended due to the COVID-19 pandemic